Vitaliia Koroleva (born 27 May 2001) is a Russian diver.

In 2017, she competed in the women's 1 metre springboard event at the European Diving Championships held in Kyiv, Ukraine.

In 2019, she won the gold medal in the women's 1 metre springboard event at the European Diving Championships held in Kyiv, Ukraine. Koroleva and Uliana Kliueva won the gold medal in the women's 3 metre synchro springboard event.

In 2021, Koroleva and Ilia Molchanov won the bronze medal in the mixed 3 m springboard synchro event at the 2020 European Aquatics Championships held in Budapest, Hungary. Koroleva and Uliana Kliueva won the bronze medal in the women's 3 m synchro springboard event.

References

External links 
 

Living people
2001 births
Place of birth missing (living people)
Russian female divers